Chris Anderson is a trumpet player with Southside Johnny and the Asbury Jukes. He is a regular performer with Bobby Bandiera and has released his own CDs. He was in the 'Orquest 88' with Hector Lavoe.

Discography
Southside Johnny & the Asbury Jukes - Pills and Ammo (2010) - Trumpet
Southside Johnny & the Asbury Jukes - Into The Harbor (2005) - Trumpet
Southside Johnny & the Asbury Jukes  - Going To Jukesville (2002) - Trumpet
Various Artists - A Very Special Christmas 5 (2002) - Trumpet
Southside Johnny & the Asbury Jukes - Superhits (2001) - Trumpet
Southside Johnny & the Asbury Jukes - Messin' With The Blues (2000) - Trumpet

References 

Year of birth missing (living people)
Living people
Musicians from New Jersey
Southside Johnny & The Asbury Jukes members
Jersey Shore musicians
American trumpeters
The Miami Horns members